De Ayala is the surname of:

 Adelardo López de Ayala y Herrera (1828–1879), Spanish writer and politician
 Enrique Zóbel de Ayala (1877–1943), Spanish-born Filipino industrialist, philanthropist, and a leader of the Philippine Falange political party
 Felipe Guaman Poma de Ayala (c. 1550–after 1616), indigenous Peruvian chronicler during the Spanish conquest
 Fernando Zobel de Ayala (born 1960), Filipino businessman, brother of Jaime Augusto Zobel de Ayala
 Jaime Augusto Zobel de Ayala (born 1959), current CEO of Ayala Corporation, son of Jaime Zobel de Ayala
 Jaime Zobel de Ayala (born 1934), Filipino businessman and photographer, founder of the Ayala Corporation
 Josefa de Óbidos (c.1630–1684), Spanish-born Portuguese painter who signed her work as Josefa de Ayala or Josefa em Óbidos
 Juan de Ayala (1745–1797), Spanish naval officer and explorer
 Pero López de Ayala (1332–1407), Castilian statesman, historian, poet, chronicler, chancellor, and courtier
 Pedro de Ayala (died 1513), Spanish diplomat in England and Scotland
 Pero López de Ayala (1332–1407), Castilian chronicler, diplomat, and poet
 Pilar López de Ayala (born 1978), Spanish film actress
 Ramón Pérez de Ayala (circa 1880–1962), Spanish writer

See also
 Ayala (surname)